Folding bed may refer to:

 Wall bed, a bed that is hinged at one end to store vertically against the wall, or inside a closet or cabinet
 Camp bed, a narrow, light-weight bed, often made of sturdy cloth stretched over a folding frame